Cookie Lommel (born 1970) is an American author, biographer, film producer, and activist.

Early life
Cookie Lommel was born in Cleveland, Ohio. She began her career in the entertainment industry in 1981. Early on she worked as a journalist for Cashbox magazine and Radio & Records magazine. She has also worked as an entertainment industry reporter at CNN and as entertainment editor at Teen Magazine.

Activism
In 2003, she was named the executive director of the Jewish Labor Committee's Western region. Prior to this, in 1992 Lommel founded Operation Unity, a non-profit organization that funded the travel of inner city minority students to live on an Israeli Kibbutz.

Author
Cookie Lommel authored the 2001 book The History of Rap Music, and Black Filmmakers in 2002. She is also the author of unauthorized biographies for Russell Simmons, Arnold Schwarzenegger, James Oglethorpe, Johnnie L. Cochran, Jr., Arthur Miller, Robert Church, Madame C.J. Walker, Michelle Pfeiffer, and Mary Church Terrell.

Personal life
She was married to actor and film director Ulli Lommel between 1988 and his death in 2017.

References

1970 births
Living people
American music journalists
American biographers
Writers from Cleveland
American magazine writers
CNN people
Music historians